Estadio La Asunción is a multi-use stadium in Asunción Mita, Guatemala. It is used mostly for football and is the home stadium of Deportivo Mictlán.  The capacity of the stadium is 3,000 people.

A 2017 report by the National Football Federation of Guatemala found that the stadium was in very poor condition and did not meet FIFA standards for security and infrastructure.

References

Multi-purpose stadiums in Guatemala
Football venues in Guatemala